Enniskillen railway station served Enniskillen in County Fermanagh, Northern Ireland.

The Londonderry and Enniskillen Railway opened the first station in the town on 19 August 1854.

The Dundalk and Enniskillen Railway opened a station slightly further south in Enniskillen on 15 February 1859; on 1 June 1860, the Londonderry and Enniskillen Railway moved so as to share the facilities at this station.

On 18 March 1879 the Sligo, Leitrim and Northern Counties Railway opened a temporary station in Enniskillen. In January 1883 the temporary station was closed, when the Sligo, Leitrim and Northern Counties Railway agreed to share facilities at the Dundalk and Enniskillen Railway station.

That station was taken over by the Great Northern Railway in 1883.

 
It closed on 1 October 1957.

Routes

References

Disused railway stations in County Fermanagh
Railway stations opened in 1854
Railway stations closed in 1957
1854 establishments in Ireland
Railway stations in Northern Ireland opened in the 19th century